This is a list of mobile phone generations in mobile telecommunications.

0G

Referred to as pre-cellular (or sometimes zero generation, that is, 0G mobile) systems.

1G

1G or (1-G) refers to the first generation of cellular network technology. These are the analog telecommunication standards that were introduced in 1979 and the early to mid-1980s and continued until being replaced by 2G digital telecommunications. The main difference between these two mobile telephone generations is that in 1G systems the audio was encoded as analog radio signals (though call set-up and other network communications were digital), while 2G networks were entirely digital.

2G

2G (or 2-G) provides three primary benefits over their predecessors: phone conversations are digitally encrypted; 2G systems are significantly more efficient on the spectrum allowing for far greater mobile phone penetration levels; and 2G introduced data services for mobile, starting with SMS (Short Message Service) plain text-based messages. 2G technologies enable the various mobile phone networks to provide the services such as text messages, picture messages and MMS (Multimedia Message Service). It has 3 main services: Bearer services is one of them which is also known as data services and communication.

Second generation 2G cellular telecom networks were commercially launched on the GSM standard in Finland by Radiolinja (now part of Elisa Oyj) in 1991.

The North American Standards IS-54 and IS-136 were also second-generation (2G) mobile phone systems, known as (Digital AMPS) and used TDMA with three time slots in each 30 kHz channel, supporting 3 digitally compressed calls in the same spectrum as a single analog call in the previous AMPS standard. This was later changed to 6 half rate time slots for more compressed calls. It was once prevalent throughout the Americas, particularly in the United States and Canada since the first commercial network was deployed in 1993 on AT&T and Rogers Wireless Networks.

IS-95 was the first ever CDMA-based digital cellular technology. It was developed by Qualcomm using Code Division Multiple Access and later adopted as a standard by the Telecommunications Industry Association in TIA/EIA/IS-95 release published in 1995. It was marketed as CDMAOne and deployed globally including China Unicom in 2002 and Verizon in the United States, competing directly with GSM services offered by AT&T and T-Mobile.

2.5G

2.5G denotes 2G-systems that have implemented a packet-switched domain in addition to the circuit-switched domain. It does not necessarily provide faster service because bundling of timeslots is used for circuit-switched data services (HSCSD) as well. Also called General Packet Radio Service or GPRS

2.75G

GPRS networks evolved to EDGE networks with the introduction of 8PSK encoding.

3G

3G technology provides an information transfer rate of at least 144 kbit/s. Later 3G releases, often denoted 3.5G and 3.75G, also provide mobile broadband access of several Mbit/s to smartphones and mobile modems in laptop computers. This ensures it can be applied to wireless voice telephony, mobile Internet access, fixed wireless Internet access, video calls and mobile TV technologies.

CDMA2000 is a family of 3G mobile technology standards for sending voice, data, and signaling data between mobile phones and cell sites. It is a backwards-compatible successor to second-generation cdmaOne (IS-95) set of standards and used especially in North America and South Korea, China, Japan, Australia and New Zealand. It was standardized in the international 3GPP2 standards body, 
The name CDMA2000 denotes a family of standards that represent the successive, evolutionary stages of the underlying technology. These are:
Voice: CDMA2000 1xRTT, 1X Advanced
Data: CDMA2000 1xEV-DO (Evolution-Data Optimized): Ultra Mobile Broadband (UMB)

A new generation of cellular standards has appeared approximately every tenth year since 1G systems were introduced in 1981/1982. Each generation is characterized by new frequency bands, higher data rates and non–backward-compatible transmission technology. The first 3G networks were introduced in 1998.

3.5G

3.5G is a grouping of disparate mobile telephony and data technologies designed to provide better performance than 3G systems, as an interim step towards the deployment of full 4G capability. The technology includes:
 High-Speed Downlink Packet Access
 Evolved HSPA

3.75G

Evolved High Speed Packet Access, or HSPA+, or HSPA(Plus), or HSPAP is a technical standard for wireless broadband telecommunication. It is the second phase of High Speed Packet Access (HSPA).

3.95G

4G

4G provides, in addition to the usual voice and other services of 3G, mobile broadband Internet access, for example to laptops with wireless modems, to smartphones, and to other mobile devices. Potential and current applications include amended mobile web access, IP telephony, gaming services, high-definition mobile TV, video conferencing, 3D television, and cloud computing.

LTE (Long Term Evolution) is commonly marketed as 4G LTE, but it did not initially meet the technical criteria of a 4G wireless service, as specified in the 3GPP Release 8 and 9 document series for LTE Advanced. Given the competitive pressures of WiMax and its evolution with Advanced new releases, it has become synonymous with 4G. It was first commercially deployed in Norway and Stockholm in 2009 and in the United States by Verizon in 2011 in their newly acquired 700 MHz band.

4.5G

4.5G provides better performance than 4G systems, as a process step towards deployment of full 5G capability.

The technology includes:
 LTE Advanced Pro
 MIMO

4.5G is marketed by AT&T as 5GE.

5G

5G was the next major phase of mobile telecommunications standards beyond the current 4G/IMT-Advanced standards.

NGMN Alliance or Next Generation Mobile Networks Alliance define 5G network requirements as: 

Data rates of several tens of megabits per second (Mbit/s) should be supported for tens of thousands of users. 
1 Gbit/s to be offered, simultaneously to tens of workers on the same office floor. 
Several hundreds of thousands of simultaneous connections to be supported for massive sensor deployments. 
Spectral efficiency should be significantly enhanced compared to 4G. 
Coverage should be improved.
Signalling efficiency enhanced.
Latency should be significantly reduced compared to LTE.

Next Generation Mobile Networks Alliance feel that 5G should be rolled out by 2020 to meet business and consumer demands. In addition to simply providing faster speeds, they predict that 5G networks will also need to meet the needs of new use-cases such as the Internet of things (IoT) as well as broadcast-like services and lifeline communications in times of disaster.

3GPP has set an early revision, non-standalone release of 5G called New Radio (5G NR). It will be deployed in two ways, Mobile and Fixed Wireless. The specification is subdivided into two frequency bands, FR1 (<6 GHz) and FR2 (mmWave) respectively.

5.25G

See also
 Comparison of mobile phone standards

References

What are the differences between 2G, 3G, 4G LTE, and 5G networks?